Xiushui may refer to several places:

China
 Xiushui County (修水县), of Jiujiang, Jiangxi
 Xiushui River, in Jiangxi
 Xiushui Street (秀水街), in Beijing
Towns (秀水镇)
 Xiushui, Lechang, Guangdong
 Xiushui, Yushu, Jilin
 Xiushui, Yu County, Shanxi
 Xiushui, An County, Sichuan

Townships (秀水鄉)
 Xiushui, Weining County, in Weining Yi Autonomous County, Guizhou

Taiwan
 Xiushui, Changhua, a rural township in Changhua County